Firza Andika (born 11 May 1999) is an Indonesian professional footballer who plays as a left-back for Liga 1 club Persija Jakarta and the Indonesia national team.

Early career 
Firza started his football training at the age of nine at the Tasbi soccer school in his hometown of Medan in North Sumatra province. Before he graduated from high school, he moved to West Sumatra province to train at Semen Padang F.C.'s academy when the club was still playing in the top-tier of Indonesian football. He received his first call to the Indonesia national under-19 football team selection while he was here.

Club career

PSMS Medan 
Firza chose to return to his hometown upon his entry to professional football and joined Liga 1 club PSMS Medan in January 2018.

He made his first-team debut for PSMS Medan when he was part of the starting lineup of a 2018 Liga 1 match against Persija Jakarta on 6 April 2018, in which PSMS won. However, he failed to help prevent his club from being relegated to Liga 2 at the end of the 2018 Liga 1 season.

AFC Tubize 
In November 2018, Firza flew to Europe to trial with Belgian lower-league club AFC Tubize and Spanish Tercera Division club UD Alzira. In January 2019, Firza Andika signed a two-year contract for AFC Tubize with the condition he would join in March 2019 after the 2019 AFF U-22 Youth Championship. However, upon his return he was embroiled in a salary dispute there and failed to play a single game for the club. As a solution, he was loaned to Liga 1 PSM Makassar for the remainder of the 2019 Liga 1 season.

PSM Makassar (loan) 
Firza extended his stay at PSM Makassar on loan for the 2020 Liga 1 season.

Firza made his debut on 1 September 2019 as a substitute in a match against Persela Lamongan. Despite the competition being canceled after three matchdays due to the COVID-19 pandemic, he did not return to Tubize.

Persikabo 1973 
At the end of his problematic contract with Tubize, Firza in early 2021 joined Liga 1 club Persikabo 1973, which is supported by the Indonesian military. At the same time, Firza enrolled himself into the Indonesian Air Force. Firza made his debut on 3 September 2021 as a substitute in a match against Madura United. On 17 October, Firza scored his first goal for Persikabo in a 3–0 victory over Borneo Samarinda at the Sultan Agung Stadium. He contributed with 28 appearances, 1 goals and 3 assists during with Persikabo 1973 for one season.

Persija Jakarta
Firza was signed for Persija Jakarta to play in Liga 1 in the 2021–22 season. He made his league debut on 23 July 2022 in a match against Bali United at the Kapten I Wayan Dipta Stadium, Gianyar. On 6 December, Firza scored his first goal for Persija in a 1–0 victory over Borneo Samarinda at the Sultan Agung Stadium.

International career
On 31 May 2017, Firza debuted for the Indonesia U-19 team in a match against Brazil U20 in the 2017 Toulon Tournament in France. Firza was also one of the players who strengthened the Indonesia U19 team in the 2018 AFC U-19 Championship. He was part of the Indonesia team that won silver in the 2019 Southeast Asian Games in the Philippines.

Firza received his first call to join the senior Indonesian national football team in May 2021. He earned his first senior cap in a 25 May 2021 friendly match in Dubai against Afghanistan.

Career statistics

Club

International

Honours

International 
Indonesia U-19
 AFF U-19 Youth Championship third place: 2017, 2018
Indonesia U-23
 AFF U-22 Youth Championship: 2019
 Southeast Asian Games  Silver medal: 2019
 Southeast Asian Games  Bronze medal: 2021

References

External links 
 Firza Andika at Soccerway
 

1999 births
Living people
Indonesian footballers
Sportspeople from North Sumatra
Sportspeople from Medan
PSMS Medan players
Semen Padang F.C. players
A.F.C. Tubize players
PSM Makassar players
Persikabo 1973 players
Persija Jakarta players
Liga 1 (Indonesia) players
Challenger Pro League players
Indonesia youth international footballers
Indonesia international footballers
Association football defenders
Indonesian expatriate footballers
Expatriate footballers in Belgium
Indonesian expatriate sportspeople in Belgium
Competitors at the 2019 Southeast Asian Games
Southeast Asian Games silver medalists for Indonesia
Southeast Asian Games medalists in football
Competitors at the 2021 Southeast Asian Games